Bangor FM, is a local radio station based in Bangor, County Down and broadcasting to the greater Bangor area. The station broadcasts a varied mixture of music, news, interviews and community information to a catchment area of over 60,000 adults in the North Down area.

Affiliation 
Bangor FM is affiliated with sister stations FM105 and Lisburn's 98FM. It is also supported by the South Eastern Regional College, which provides studio and production space. SERC provides a route of access to the station for students interested in the media field.

Licence 
Bangor FM holds a community radio licence, issued by Ofcom. Prior to 2011, it operated on a RSL short-term licence.

Young Star Search 
Young Star Search run on Bangor FM in 2004, then as a stand-alone event in 2005 and then back on Bangor FM in 2006. In 2007 the Bangor Young Star Search ran as a part of a bigger contest on Belfast CityBeat.

References

Radio stations in Northern Ireland
Mass media in County Down
Bangor, County Down
Radio stations established in 2004